Mohammad Razipour is an Iranian Football player who currently plays for Iranian football club Malavan in the Iran Pro League.

Club career

Malavan
Razipour started his career with Malavan youth levels. He was promoted to te first team by Nosrat Irandoost in the summer of 2014. He made his debut for Malavan in 2014–15 Iran Pro League against Zob Ahan as a substitute for Mohsen Yousefi.

Club career statistics

References

External links
 Mohammad Razipour at IranLeague.ir

1993 births
Living people
Iranian footballers
Malavan players
People from Babol
Association football wingers
Sportspeople from Mazandaran province